Fizzy-related protein homolog, also known as hCDH1, is a protein that in humans is encoded by the FZR1 gene.

Interactions 

FZR1 has been shown to interact with CDC27 and FBXO5.

References

Further reading

External links